Len Ormsby (21 September 1890 in New York City, New York – 13 March 1983 in San Antonio, Texas) was an American racecar driver.

Indy 500 results

References

Indianapolis 500 drivers
1890 births
1983 deaths
Racing drivers from New York City